, also known as Omakase Mamitasu (おまかせマミタス "Leave it to Mamitas") is a Japanese anime series produced by OLM, Inc. and Shogakukan-Shueisha Productions and aired on NHK in between the variety programs, Tensai Terebi-kun and R no Hōsoku from March 31, 2015 to February 23, 2016. The series is adapted from Neko no Ashiato, an autobiographical essay book by Shoko Nakagawa. The series depicts the slapstick comedy of ten idiosyncratic cats and the members of the unusual Nakagawa family.

Production
The ten cats reflect the ten cats Nakagawa owns in real life, and she adores one in particular, Mamitas, which is also the name of the series' cat protagonist. While the anime is aimed at children, its production committee stated that "the heartfelt story will remind a wide range of generations of something comforting that they may have forgotten in recent times". The series portrays Nakagawa as a child named Pokomi (also known by her nickname "Pokotan"), with Natsuhiko, who watches over her from heaven. Nakagawa stated that "She never dreamed that the day would come when her precious cat Mamitas would be animated." She watched much anime in her childhood, and learned courage and love from them. She also stated that "She hopes that many children, or even just one, will feel something similar through this anime."

The opening theme is "Neko Boogie" (ネコブギー Cat Boogie) by Shokotan♥Haruomi (Haruomi Hosono and Shoko Nakagawa).

Characters

Main characters
 / 
 
A girl who is in the fourth grade.

The Akagawa family's pet cat. Whenever he transforms into his miracle cat form, he ends his sentences with no nā (のナー) or nā (ナー).

Akagawa family

Pokomi's late pop-star father.

Pokomi's mother.

Pokomi's grandmother.

References

External links
 

OLM, Inc.
Fictional cats
Children's manga
NHK original programming
Anime with original screenplays
2015 manga
Comedy anime and manga